Buena Vista Wildlife Area is a state wildlife area in Portage County, Wisconsin, United States.

Geography
Buena Vista Wildlife Area is located on fragmented lands south of the Village of Plover and the Wisconsin River, east of Biron, Wisconsin Rapids, and Kellner, north of State Road 73, Adams County, and Waushara County, and west of Bancroft and Interstate 39 / U.S. Highway 51. The Buena Vista Marsh has various parcels of land in many sizes and shapes located in the towns of Grant, Buena Vista, Pine Grove, and Town of Plover.

Management
The Buena Vista Marsh is managed in cooperation of the Wisconsin Department of Natural Resources, and the Wildlife Society at the University of Wisconsin–Stevens Point. The Buena Vista Marsh is often managed toward prairie chicken. The Buena Vista Marsh is noted by tourists in the spring who flock to see the mating rituals of the prairie chicken.

Notes

State Wildlife Areas of Wisconsin
Protected areas of Portage County, Wisconsin